Swan Canning Riverpark consists of the waterways and public foreshore reserves in the Swan and Canning Rivers in Perth, Western Australia.

It is managed by the Parks and Wildlife Service of the WA Department of Biodiversity, Conservation and Attractions (DBCA) in conjunction with local authorities and on behalf of the Swan River Trust.

See also 
 Canning River Regional Park
 Walyunga National Park
 Avon Valley National Park
 Melville Water, including Swan Estuary Marine Park
 Perth Water

References

External links 
 Map, areas outlined in blue.

Swan River (Western Australia)
Canning River (Western Australia)